Magic Fingers is an album by guitarist Chuck Loeb and pianist Andy LaVerne recorded in 1989 and released on the DMP label.

Reception 

Ron Wynn of AllMusic stated, "A good duet and an excellent recording".

Track listing 
All compositions by Chuck Loeb except where noted.

 "Book & Beads" – 4:55
 "Circadian Rhythm" (Andy LaVerne) – 4:57
 "Groovin'" (Felix Cavaliere, Eddie Brigati) – 4:38
 "Far" – 4:55
 "Sueños" (Andy LaVerne, Carmen Cuesta) – 4:46
 "23rd & 15th" – 4:32
 "The Mission" – 4:59
 "Europa" (LaVerne) – 4:33
 "Magic Fingers" (LaVerne, Loeb) – 4:36
 "Maybe..." – 7:02
 "Chappaqua" (LaVerne) – 3:40

Personnel 
 Chuck Loeb – guitars, keyboards
 Andy LaVerne – acoustic piano
 Clifford Carter – synthesizers
 Will Lee – bass
 Dave Weckl – drums
 Steve Thornton – percussion
 Lygya Barreto – percussion (2, 4, 5)
 Carmen Cuesta – vocals

Production 
 Chuck Loeb – producer 
 Tom Jung – producer, recording 
 Andy LaVerne – co-producer
 Troy Halderson – recording assistant 
 Ron Finger – cover artwork 
 Jim Henderson – design 
 Dave King – photography

References 

Chuck Loeb albums
Andy LaVerne albums
1990 albums
DMP Digital Music Products albums
Collaborative albums